Hershey may refer to:

People 
 Hershey (name), a list of people with the surname, given name or nickname

Places
 Hershey, Nebraska, a village
 Hershey, Pennsylvania, an unincorporated community, home to the chocolate company
 Hershey, Cuba, also known as Camilo Cienfuegos, a village in Mayabeque province

Companies and organizations
 The Hershey Company, North American chocolate manufacturer
 Hershey bar, a Hershey product
 Hershey Creamery Company, an unrelated ice cream manufacturer
 Hershey Development, a slot machine manufacturer, and parent company of Jennings & Co.
 Hershey Electric Railway, from Havana to Matanzas, Cuba
 Hershey Trust Company, Milton Hershey's trust
 Hershey Entertainment and Resorts Company, Hershey, Pennsylvania:
 Hershey Park
 The Hershey Story

Schools
 Hershey School of Musical Art, Chicago, Illinois
 Hershey High School (Pennsylvania), Hershey, Pennsylvania

Sports
 Hershey Open, a PGA golf tournament from 1933 to 1941, played in Hershey, Pennsylvania
 Hershey Bears, a hockey team based in Hershey, Pennsylvania
 Hershey FC, a soccer club based in Hershey, Pennsylvania, from 1997 to 2001
 Hershey Impact, a soccer club based in Hershey, Pennsylvania, from 1988 to 1991
 Hershey Wildcats, a soccer club based in Hershey, Pennsylvania

Other uses
 Hershey fonts, an influential collection of computer fonts developed in 1967
 The Hotel Hershey, Hershey, Pennsylvania
 Hershey: Milton S. Hershey's Extraordinary Life of Wealth, Empire, and Utopian Dreams, 2006 biography by Michael D'Antonio
 Judge Hershey, a character in Judge Dredd

See also
 Hershey's (disambiguation)
 Hershey Centre, a sports and entertainment complex in Mississauga, Ontario, Canada
 Hershey House, Perry Township, Indiana, on the National Register of Historic Places
 Hershey Ridge
 Hershey Run
 , a soft drink company in the Netherlands